Seikichi (written: 清吉 or 政吉) is a masculine Japanese given name. Notable people with the name include:

Seikichi Odo (1926–2002), Japanese karateka
 (1917–1998), Japanese karateka

Fictional characters:
 character in the stage play and anime series Oh! Edo Rocket
Seikichi Tamaya is an antagonist in Hidamari no Ki

Japanese masculine given names